The Night of the Cookers is a live album by trumpeter Freddie Hubbard recorded at Club La Marchal in April 1965 and released on the Blue Note label, originally as two volumes on LP. It features performances by Hubbard, Lee Morgan, James Spaulding, Harold Mabern, Jr., Larry Ridley, Pete LaRoca and Big Black. It has been called "one of the most compelling documents of a live band in full flight".

Track listing
 "Pensativa" (Clare Fischer) - 23:30  
 "Walkin'" (Richard Carpenter) - 19:27  
 "Jodo" - 22:15  
 "Breaking Point" - 21:43  
All compositions by Freddie Hubbard except as indicated
Recorded on April 9 & 10, 1965 at Club La Marchal, Brooklyn, NY

Personnel
Freddie Hubbard - trumpet
Lee Morgan - trumpet
James Spaulding - alto saxophone, flute
Harold Mabern, Jr. - piano
Larry Ridley - bass 
Pete LaRoca - drums 
Danny "Big Black" Rey - congas

References

Albums produced by Alfred Lion
1965 live albums
Freddie Hubbard live albums
Blue Note Records live albums